Ditolylguanidine is a sigma receptor agonist. It is somewhat selective for sigma receptors, but non-selective between the two sigma receptor subtypes, binding to both σ1 and σ2 with equal affinity. It has neuroprotective and antidepressant effects, and potentiates the effects of NMDA antagonists.

See also
 Aptiganel

References

Sigma agonists
Guanidines
2-Tolyl compounds